Consensus Ontario is a minor political party in Ontario, Canada. The party is led by Brad Harness.

History
Consensus Ontario was founded in 2016 as a think tank. Its leader, Brad Harness, has been 
the leader of the Reform Party of Ontario and founder of the Ontario Party of Canada, two smaller populist parties in the early 2000s. In preparation for the 2018 Ontario general election, the think tank registered as an official political party with Elections Ontario and fielded ten candidates for the election.

Platform
The party has detailed several priority issues on its website:

Introducing a single flat rate for electricity
Reducing wait-times at health centres
Building a long-term policy for rural and agricultural regions in Ontario
Supporting immigration resettlement to rural areas
Giving more autonomy to municipalities for planning and taxation
Increased long-term care funding for seniors
Overhauling the Ontario school curriculum, including the sexual education program
Construction of high-speed rail in the province
Turning the Gardiner Expressway and Don Valley Parkway into provincial highways

Consensus Ontario's keystone policy is the removal of all political parties provincially and moving toward a non-partisan Consensus democracy. Consensus democracy, used in the northern territorial governments of the Northwest Territories and Nunavut, members of the legislature would not be bound by party discipline to choose a leader, speaker, or policy position. The party also supports several other areas of democratic reform, including recall elections and referendums.

The party also pays special attention to the provincial debt. One of Consensus Ontario's founding principles calls for a balanced budget. The party hopes to balance the provincial budget within its first term in government, hoping to find 10% savings for taxpayers.

Election results
Including party leader Harness, Consensus Ontario nominated 10 candidates for the 2018 Ontario general election.
In total, the party got 2,682 votes finishing 9th among 28 parties.

References

Provincial political parties in Ontario
Centrist parties in Canada
2017 establishments in Ontario
Organizations based in Ontario